Filosofický časopis is a peer-reviewed academic journal on philosophy. The journal was established in 1953 by the Czechoslovak Academy of Sciences. Nowadays Filosofický časopis is published by the Institute for philosophy of the Academy of Sciences of the Czech Republic.

Filosofický časopis is the oldest philosophical journal among those which are now published in the Czech Republic. It covers all philosophical traditions and all the areas of philosophy. It is indexed in the Web of Science, Scopus, DOAJ, ERIH and ISI databases. The editor-in-chief is Milan Znoj.

See also 
 List of philosophy journals

External links 
  
 Filosofický časopis (Philosophical Journal) 
 Archive of the journal at the site of the Digital Library of the Academy of Sciences of the Czech Republic

Notes 

Philosophy journals
Bimonthly journals
Publications established in 1953
Czech-language journals
Czech philosophy